William Fulford was Archdeacon of Barnstaple from 1462 until 1475.

References

Archdeacons of Barnstaple
15th-century English clergy